Gilbert De La Matyr (July 8, 1825 in Pharsalia, New York – May 17, 1892 in Akron, Ohio) was an American cleric and politician from New York and Indiana, serving one term in the  U.S. House from 1879 to 1881.

Life
He graduated from a theological course of the Methodist Episcopal Church in 1854 and became an itinerant elder. He served as member of the General Conference in 1868, and for one term was Presiding Elder.

Civil War 
During the American Civil War, he helped enlist the 8th New York Heavy Artillery Regiment in 1862, and was its chaplain for three years.

Political career 
In 1867 he ran on the Republican ticket for New York State Prison Inspector but was defeated by Democrat Solomon Scheu.

After holding pastorates in several large cities he settled in Indianapolis, Indiana, and continued his ministerial duties. Here, De La Matyr was elected as a National Greenback candidate to the 46th United States Congress and served from March 4, 1879, to March 3, 1881.

Later career and death 
He moved to Denver, Colorado, in 1881 and again engaged in preaching. There, he became pastor of Evans Chapel in 1886 helped organized the construction of an expanded sanctuary named Grace Church. From 1889 on, he was Pastor of the First Methodist Episcopal Church of Akron, Ohio.

References

1825 births
1892 deaths
People from Chenango County, New York
Methodists from New York (state)
New York (state) Republicans
Greenback Party members of the United States House of Representatives from Indiana
Politicians from Akron, Ohio
Politicians from Indianapolis
19th-century American clergy
Union Army chaplains
People of New York (state) in the American Civil War